The 1989 edition of the Campeonato Carioca kicked off on February 11, 1989 and ended on June 21, 1989. It is the official tournament organized by FFERJ (Federação de Futebol do Estado do Rio de Janeiro, or Rio de Janeiro State Football Federation. Only clubs based in the Rio de Janeiro State are allowed to play. Twelve teams contested this edition. Botafogo won the title for the 15th time. Volta Redonda and Olaria were relegated.

System
The tournament would be divided in three stages:
 Taça Guanabara: The twelve teams all played in a single round-robin format against each other. The champions qualified to the Final phase. 
 Taça Rio: The twelve teams all played in a single round-robin format against each other. The champions qualified to the Final phase.
 Final phase: In the Semifinals, the champions of Taça Guanabara and Taça Rio would play in a single match. the winner would face the team with the best season record in the Finals, also played in a single match. In case that the same team won two of these stages, the Semifinals wouldn't be necessary and the Finals would be held in two matches.

Championship

Taça Guanabara

Copa Rio

Aggregate table

Final

References

Campeonato Carioca seasons
Carioca